Sexy Stream Liner is the tenth album by Buck-Tick, their first on Mercury Music Entertainment, released on December 10, 1997. It reached number four on the Oricon chart with 78,820 copies sold. Starting with this album, Hisashi Imai started using the theremin in their sound. Like their previous album, Sexy Stream Liner is very influenced by the cyberpunk subculture.

Track listing

Personnel

Buck-Tick 
 Atsushi Sakurai - vocal
 Hisashi Imai - electric guitar, vocal on track 10
 Hidehiko Hoshino - rhythm guitar
 Yutaka Higuchi - bass guitar
 Toll Yagami - drums

Additional musicians
 Kazutoshi Yokoyama - manipulation, keyboard

References 

Buck-Tick albums
Japanese-language albums
1997 albums
Industrial rock albums